José Alberto "Pepe" Mujica Cordano (born 20 May 1935) is a Uruguayan politician, former revolutionary and farmer who served as the 40th president of Uruguay from 2010 to 2015. A former guerrilla with the Tupamaros, he was tortured and imprisoned for 14 years during the military dictatorship in the 1970s and 1980s. A member of the Broad Front coalition of left-wing parties, Mujica was Minister of Livestock, Agriculture, and Fisheries from 2005 to 2008 and a Senator afterwards. As the candidate of the Broad Front, he won the 2009 presidential election and took office as president on 1 March 2010. He was the Second Gentleman of Uruguay from 13 September 2017 to 1 March 2020, when his wife Lucia Topolansky was vice president under his immediate predecessor and successor, Tabaré Vázquez.

He has been described as "the world's humblest head of state" due to his austere lifestyle and his donation of around 90 percent of his $12,000 monthly salary to charities that benefit poor people and small entrepreneurs. An outspoken critic of capitalism's focus on stockpiling material possessions which do not contribute to human happiness, Mujica is often seen riding his 60-year-old bicycle. The Times Higher Education called him the "philosopher president" in 2015, a play on words of Plato's conception of the philosopher king.

Early life 
Mujica was born on 20 May 1935, to Demetrio Mujica, of Spanish Basque ancestry, and Lucy Cordano, a daughter of Italian immigrants. Mujica's father was a small farmer who went bankrupt shortly before his death in 1940, when his son was five. His mother's parents were very poor Italian immigrants from Liguria. Lucy Cordano was born in Carmelo, where her parents had bought  in Colonia Jose to cultivate vineyards. Between the ages of 13 and 17, Mujica cycled for several clubs in different categories. He was also active in the National Party, where he became close to Enrique Erro.

Guerrilla 

In the mid-1960's, he joined the newly formed MLN-Tupamaros movement, an armed political group inspired by the Cuban Revolution. He participated in the brief 1969 takeover of Pando, a town close to Montevideo, leading one of six squads assaulting strategic points in the city. Mujica's team was charged with taking over the telephone exchange and was the only one to complete the operation without any mishaps. In March 1970 Mujica was gunned down while resisting arrest at a Montevideo bar; he injured two policemen and was in turn shot six times. The surgeon on call at the hospital saved his life. Tupamaros claimed that the surgeon was secretly Tupamaro and this is why his life was saved. In reality the doctor was simply following ordinary medical ethics. At the time, the president of Uruguay was the controversial Jorge Pacheco Areco, who had suspended certain constitutional guarantees in response to MLN and Communist unrest.

Mujica was captured by the authorities on four occasions. He was among the more than 100 Tupamaros who escaped Punta Carretas Prison in September 1971 by digging a tunnel from inside the prison that led to the living room of a nearby home. Mujica was re-captured less than a month after escaping, but escaped Punta Carretas once more in April 1972. On that occasion he and about a dozen other escapees fled riding improvised wheeled planks down the tunnel dug by Tupamaros from outside the prison. He was re-apprehended for the last time in 1972, unable to resist arrest. In the months that followed, the country underwent the military coup in 1973. In the meantime, Mujica and eight other Tupamaros were especially chosen to remain under military custody and in squalid conditions. In all, he spent 13 years in captivity. During the 1970s and 1980s, this included being confined to the bottom of an old, emptied horse-watering trough for more than two years. During his time in prison, Mujica suffered a number of health problems, particularly mental issues. Although his two closest cellmates, Eleuterio Fernández Huidobro and Mauricio Rosencof, often managed to communicate with each other, they rarely managed to bring Mujica into the conversation. According to Mujica himself, at the time he was suffering from auditory hallucinations and related forms of paranoia.

In 1985, when constitutional democracy was restored, Mujica was freed under an amnesty law that covered political and related military crimes committed since 1962.

Several years after the restoration of democracy, Mujica and many Tupamaros joined other left-wing organizations to create the Movement of Popular Participation, a political party that was accepted within the Broad Front coalition.

In the 1994 general elections, Mujica was elected deputy and in the elections of 1999 he was elected senator. Due in part to Mujica's charisma, the MPP continued to grow in popularity and votes, and by 2004, it had become the largest faction within the Broad Front. In the elections of that year, Mujica was re-elected to the Senate, and the MPP obtained over 300,000 votes, thus consolidating its position as the top political force within the coalition and a major force behind the victory of presidential candidate Tabaré Vázquez. Mujica was then elected in 2009 as president in the following elections.

Minister of Agriculture 
On 1 March 2005, President Tabaré Vázquez designated Mujica as the Minister of Livestock, Agriculture and Fisheries (Mujica's own professional background was in the agricultural sector). Upon becoming minister, Mujica resigned his position as senator. He held this position until a cabinet change in 2008, when he resigned and was replaced by Ernesto Agazzi. Mujica then returned to his seat in the Senate.

Political positions 

Mujica's political ideology has evolved over the years from orthodox to pragmatist. In recent times he has expressed a desire for a more flexible political left.
His speaking style and manner is credited as part of his growing popularity since the late 1990s, especially among rural and poor sectors of the population. He has been variously described as an "antipolitician" and a man who "speaks the language of the people" while also receiving criticism for untimely or inappropriate remarks. Unlike president Vázquez, who vetoed a bill put forward by parliament that would make abortions legal, Mujica has stated that should it come before him in the future, he would not veto such a bill. In the sphere of international relations, he hopes to further negotiations and agreements between the European Union and the regional trade bloc Mercosur, of which Uruguay is a founding member.

On the Uruguay River pulp mill dispute between Argentina and Uruguay, Mujica was more conciliatory toward the Argentine government than the previous administration, and in 2010 the two nations ended their long-running dispute and signed an agreement detailing an environmental monitoring plan of the river and the setting up of a binational commission. Good personal relations between Mujica and Argentinian counterpart Cristina Kirchner helped lead to the accord. Other bilateral issues remain unsolved, including the dredging of the shared access channel of the River Plate.

He was close to Venezuelan President Hugo Chávez, whom he considered to be "the most generous ruler I have ever known." In 2011, he spoke out against the military operations launched by several Western countries against Libya.

Asked about Brazilian President Lula da Silva's decision to receive Mahmoud Ahmadinejad, he answered it was a "genius move" because "The more Iran is fenced in, the worse it will be for the rest of the world."

Even though President Vázquez favored his Finance Minister Danilo Astori as presidential candidate of the then unified Broad Front to succeed him in 2010, Mujica's broad appeal and growing support within the party posed a challenge to the president. On 14 December 2008, The Extraordinary Congress "Zelmar Michelini" (a party convention) proclaimed Mujica as the official candidate of the Broad Front for primary elections of 2009, but four more precandidates were allowed to participate, including Astori. On 28 June 2009, Mujica won the primary elections becoming the presidential candidate of the Broad Front for the 2009 general election. After that, Astori agreed to be his running mate. Their campaign was centered on the concept of continuing and deepening the policies of the highly popular administration of Vázquez, using the slogan “Un gobierno honrado, un país de primera" ("An honorable government - a first-class country") – indirectly referencing cases of administrative corruption within the former government of the major opposition candidate, conservative Luis Alberto Lacalle. During the campaign, Mujica distanced himself from the governing style of presidents like Hugo Chávez (Venezuela) or Evo Morales (Bolivia), claiming the center-left governments of Brazilian Luiz Inácio Lula da Silva or Chilean socialist Michelle Bachelet as regional examples upon which he would model his administration. Known for his informal style of dress, Mujica donned a suit (without a tie) for some stops in the presidential campaign, notably during visits to regional heads of state.

In October 2009, Mujica won a plurality of over 48 percent of the votes compared to 30 percent for former president Lacalle, falling short of the majority required by the constitution, while at the same time renewing the Broad Front's parliamentary majority for the next legislature (2010–2015). A runoff was then held on 29 November to determine the winner; on 30 November Mujica emerged as the victor, with more than 52% of the vote over Lacalle's 43%. In his first speech as president-elect before a crowd of supporters, Mujica acknowledged his political adversaries and called for unity, stating that there would be no winners or losers ("Ni vencidos, ni vencedores"). He added that "it is a mistake to think that power comes from above, when it comes from within the hearts of the masses (...) it has taken me a lifetime to learn this fact".

Government 

Mujica formed a cabinet made up of politicians from the different components of the Broad Front, conceding the area of economics to aides of his vice president Danilo Astori.

In June 2012, Mujica's government made a controversial move to legalize state-controlled sales of marijuana in Uruguay in order to fight drug-related crimes and health issues, and stated that they would ask global leaders to do the same. Mujica said that by regulating Uruguay's estimated $40 million-a-year marijuana business, the state would take it away from drug traffickers, and weaken the drug cartels. The state would also be able to keep track of all marijuana consumers in the country and provide treatment to the most serious abusers, much like that which is done with alcoholics. 
Mujica also passed a same-sex marriage law and legalized abortion for women.

In September 2013, Mujica addressed the United Nations General Assembly, with a very long speech devoted to humanity and globalization. The speech called on the international community to strengthen efforts to preserve the planet for future generations and highlighted the power of the financial systems and the impact of economic fallout on ordinary people. He urged a return to simplicity, with lives founded on human relationships, love, friendship, adventure, solidarity and family, instead of lives shackled to the economy and the markets. Parts of his speech were incorporated into the intro to the song Santiago on Newen Afrobeat's first album.

In general terms, its policy was in line with the previous mandate. The share of social expenditure in total public expenditure thus rose from 60.9% to 75.5% between 2004 and 2013. During this period, the unemployment rate remained at about 7%, the national poverty rate was reduced from 18% to 9.7% and the minimum wage was raised from UYU$4,800 to UYU$10,000 (average annual inflation rate of 7%) and the Government's debt raised from 59% to 65%. It also supported the strengthening of trade unions. According to the International Trade Union Confederation, Uruguay has become the most advanced country in the Americas in terms of respect for "fundamental labor rights, in particular freedom of association, the right to collective bargaining and the right to strike".

Mujica was barred from running for reelection in 2014; the Constitution does not allow presidents to run for immediate reelection. Thus, on 1 March 2015, Mujica's term as president came to an end. He was succeeded by Vázquez, who returned to office for a second non-consecutive term. According to BBC correspondent Wyre Davies, "Mujica left office with a relatively healthy economy and with social stability those bigger neighbors could only dream of."

Personal life 

In 2005, Mujica married Lucía Topolansky, a fellow former Tupamaros member after many years living together. They have no children and live on a farm owned by Lucía in the outskirts of Montevideo, where they cultivate chrysanthemums for sale, having declined to live in the presidential palace or to use its staff. Also living at his farm is his three-legged dog, Manuela. Topolansky briefly served as acting president in November 2010 while her husband took part in a business delegation to Spain and Vice President Astori was on an official trip to Antarctica. Before then, she served in the Chamber of Deputies and the Senate.

Mujica has drawn worldwide attention for his simple lifestyle. He has used a 1987 Volkswagen Beetle as a means of transportation. In 2010, the value of the car was $1,800 and represented the entirety of the mandatory annual personal wealth declaration filed by Mujica for that year. In November 2014, the Uruguayan newspaper Búsqueda reported that he had been offered 1 million dollars for the car; he said that if he did get 1 million dollars for the car, it would be donated to house the homeless through a program that he supports.

Mujica is an atheist.

International relevance

During the last months of 2013, the Serbian film director Emir Kusturica started shooting a documentary on the life of Mujica, El Pepe, una vida suprema released in 2018, whom he considers "the last hero of politics". In 2014 Italian author Frank Iodice wrote the book Breve dialogo sulla felicità, which centers on the life of Mujica. Ten thousand copies of the book were printed and distributed for free to local school children. In June 2016, Mujica received the Order of the Flag of Republika Srpska from the president of Republika Srpska, Milorad Dodik.

Uruguayan film director Álvaro Brechner's 2018 film A Twelve-Year Night (La noche de 12 años) was based on Mujica's 12-year-long prison life under military dictatorship. It premiered in official selection at the 75th Venice International Film Festival, and it was selected as the Uruguayan entry for the Best Foreign Language Film at the 91st Academy Awards. The film won the Golden Pyramid Award at the 40th Cairo International Film Festival.

During a talk at the 28th Guadalajara International Book Fair (Mexico), on Sunday 7 December 2014, Mujica was interviewed by Mexican journalist Ricardo Rocha. Uruguay's President addressed several topics, such as drug trafficking, drug legalization, poverty and social injustice. "We live on the most unjust continent in the world, probably the richest, but with the worst distribution [of wealth]." On Latin America, José Mujica stated that he was "passionate about bringing Latin Americans together, about what defines us as belonging to a great nation that is to be created. There are multinational states, like China, like India, like what Europe is doing after a history of wars." Mujica also addressed the question of the shared linguistic heritage of Latin Americans, remarking with respect to the region's two major languages that "Portuguese is a sweet Spanish, if you speak it slowly... and even more so if it has a feminine sweetness." And he pointed out another element that unites the countries in Latin America: "We have another identity: the Christian and Catholic tradition." He concluded his talk by adding: "I see that there are many young people here; as an old man, a little advice: Life can set us a lot of snares, a lot of bumps, we can fail a thousand times, in life, in love, in the social struggle, but, if we search for it, we'll have the strength to get up again and start over. The most beautiful thing about the day is that it dawns. There is always a dawn after the night has passed. Don't forget it, kids. The only losers are the ones who stop fighting."

Honors and awards

References

Further reading 

  Biography by CIDOB Foundation
 Uruguay's President-Elect: Che Guevara’s Spiritual Heir by The Daily Maverick
 
  Mujica, el viaje de un tupamaro
  Mujica por Pagina 12: "En mi paisito vale la pena invertir"
  Infolatam.com

External links 

 José Pepe Mujica: Biography of the Former President
 
 

|-

1935 births
Anti-capitalists
Broad Front (Uruguay) politicians
Candidates for President of Uruguay
 
Living people
Male feminists
Ministers of Livestock, Agriculture, and Fisheries of Uruguay
Movement of Popular Participation politicians
Pantheists
Presidents of Uruguay
Presidents pro tempore of the Union of South American Nations
Prisoners and detainees of Uruguay
Uruguayan atheists
Uruguayan farmers
Uruguayan feminists
Uruguayan guerrillas
Uruguayan people of Basque descent
Uruguayan people of Italian descent
Uruguayan people of Spanish descent
Uruguayan prisoners and detainees
Uruguayan socialists